Jiang Xinyu (born 3 March 1999) is an inactive Chinese tennis player.

On 29 May 2017, she achieved a career-high singles ranking of world No. 561. On 2 April 2018, she peaked at No. 88 in the doubles rankings. Jiang has won two doubles titles on the WTA Tour and 14 doubles titles on the ITF Circuit.

Jiang won her biggest title to date in 2017 at the Jiangxi International in Nanchang, partnering Tang Qianhui, and then successfully defended it the following year.

WTA career finals

Doubles: 2 (2 titles)

ITF Circuit finals

Doubles: 22 (14 titles, 8 runner-ups)

External links
 
 

1999 births
Living people
Chinese female tennis players
21st-century Chinese women